Allocota bicolor is a species of ground beetle in the Lebiinae subfamily that can be found in such Asian countries as China, Laos, Thailand and Viet Nam.

Description
Its head and pronotum is of orange red colour with yellowish brown mouthparts. Its palpomeres is of dark brown colour.

References

Beetles described in 2013
Beetles of Asia